Rentiapril is an ACE inhibitor.

References

ACE inhibitors
Carboxamides
Carboxylic acids
Enantiopure drugs
Phenols
Thiazolidines
Thiols